Tax1-binding protein 3 is a protein that in humans is encoded by the TAX1BP3 gene.  This name is in reference to the Tax1 protein of the Human T-cell Lymphotropic Virus (HTLV) which was used to discover Tax1BP3 in a yeast 2-hybrid screen and subsequently verified by co-IP.  TIP1, as it is also known, is a PDZ domain containing protein.  However, unlike most PDZ domain proteins which act as scaffolds and often contain multiple PDZ domains as well as other protein domains, TIP1 is essentially just the PDZ domain.  This has led to the speculation that TIP1 acts as an inhibitor, either acting to separate PDZ binding motifs from their normal targets or simply preventing the protein to migrate away from the cytosol.

References

Further reading